Bastia – Poretta Airport) is an airport serving Bastia on the French mediterranean island of Corsica.

History

In 1944, during World War II, the airport was used by the United States Army Air Forces Twelfth Air Force. On 31 July 1944, Antoine de Saint-Exupéry, the legendary French pilot, took off from this airport and disappeared, on a reconnaissance flight over France in a Lockheed P-38 Lightning.

USAAF combat units assigned:

 414th Night Fighter Squadron, (Twelfth Air Force), 5 February–July 1944; 5 September – 13 October 1944, Bristol Beaufighter
527th Fighter Squadron, 86th Fighter Group, (Twelfth Air Force), 12 July-23 September 1944, P-47 Thunderbolt 
 416th Night Fighter Squadron, (Twelfth Air Force), 14–23 August 1944, P-61 Black Widow
 417th Night Fighter Squadron, (Twelfth Air Force), February–April 1944; 25 April – 7 September 1944, Bristol Beaufighter
 5th Photographic Reconnaissance Squadron, (3d Reconnaissance Group), 11 July – 24 September 1944, P-38/F-5 Lightning
 23rd Photographic Reconnaissance Squadron, (3d Reconnaissance Group), 11 July – 24 September 1944, P-38/F-5 Lightning
 111th Tactical Reconnaissance Squadron, (XII Tactical Air Command), 21 July – 27 August 1944, P-51/F-6 Mustang
 42nd Bombardment Wing was headquartered at the airfield, 21 September – 24 November 1944.

Airlines and destinations
The following airlines operate regular scheduled and charter flights at Bastia – Poretta irport:

Statistics

References

External links

Bastia Airport (official site) 
Aéroport de Bastia-Poretta at Union des Aéroports Français 

Airports in Corsica
Airport
Airfields of the United States Army Air Forces in France
Buildings and structures in Haute-Corse